Edward Telfair (1735 – September 17, 1807) was a Scottish-born American Founding Father, politician and slave trader who served as the governor of Georgia from 1786 to 1787 and again from 1790 to 1793. He was a member of the Continental Congress and one of the signers of the Articles of Confederation.

Early life
Telfair was born in 1735 at Toron Head, his family's ancestral estate in western Scotland.  He graduated from the Kirkcudbright Grammar School before acquiring commercial training. He immigrated to America in 1758 as an agent of a commission house, settling in Virginia. Telfair subsequently moved to Halifax, North Carolina, and finally to Savannah, Georgia, where he established his own commission house. He arrived in Georgia in 1766, joining his brother, William, who had emigrated earlier. Together with Basil Cowper, Telfair built the commission house, and it was an overnight success. Telfair married 16-year-old Sarah Gibbons in 1774 at her mother's Sharon Plantation just west of Savannah.

Telfair was a slave owner and a consultant on issues related to slavery. His mercantile firm dealt in slaves, among other things, and contemporary correspondence of his included discussions of such topics as: the management of slaves; the purchase and sale of slaves; runaway slaves; the mortality rate of slaves born on plantations; the difficulty of selling closely related slaves; and the relations between whites and freedmen.

Revolutionary period
Telfair was a member of a Committee of Safety (1775–1776) and was a delegate to the Georgia Provincial Congress meeting at Savannah in 1776. He was also a member of the Georgia Committee of Intelligence in 1776. Telfair was elected to the Continental Congress for 1778, 1780, 1781, and 1782. He was a signatory to the Articles of Confederation. 

In 1783, during the Cherokee–American wars, Telfair was commissioned to treat with the Chickamauga Cherokee Indians. Telfair was the designated agent (on behalf of Georgia) in talks aimed at settling the northern boundary dispute with North Carolina in February 1783. The land in question was generally regarded as Creek land, so the Cherokees readily signed the treaty. The Creeks refused. Although the citizens of Franklin County begged him to retaliate, Secretary of War Henry Knox instructed Governor Telfair not to retaliate against the Creek Indians.

He served three terms as governor of Georgia. During his second term as governor, he illegally granted thousands of acres of land to speculators as part of the Yazoo land scandal. Telfair was one of only 12 men who received electoral votes during the first election for President and Vice President of the United States, receiving the vote of one unrecorded elector from his home state of Georgia.

Death and legacy
Telfair died in Savannah in 1807, interred initially in the family vault at Sharon Plantation. Later in the 19th century, his remains were moved to Bonaventure Cemetery in Savannah. Three months after Telfair died, Georgia named Telfair County after the former governor. Later in the 19th century, Savannah's St. James Square was renamed Telfair Square to honor the family.

One of Telfair's sons, Thomas Telfair, represented Georgia in the U.S. Congress. The eldest of the Telfair daughters, Mary Telfair, outlived her siblings and became the benefactor of the first public art museum in the American South, now a complex of three buildings called the Telfair Museums. After her death in 1875, her will also provided for the founding of the Telfair Hospital for Females. Today it is known as Mary Telfair Women's Hospital.

See also
 List of U.S. state governors born outside the United States

References

External links
 Edward Telfair in the New Georgia Encyclopedia
 
 Ga. Governor Edward Telfair at National Governors Association site
 

1735 births
1807 deaths
British emigrants to the Thirteen Colonies
American Protestants
Continental Congressmen from Georgia (U.S. state)
18th-century American politicians
Signers of the Articles of Confederation
Governors of Georgia (U.S. state)
Burials in Georgia (U.S. state)
Candidates in the 1788–1789 United States presidential election
Georgia (U.S. state) Democratic-Republicans
Independent state governors of the United States
Democratic-Republican Party state governors of the United States
Georgia (U.S. state) Independents
American slave owners
American slave traders
Politicians from Savannah, Georgia
Founding Fathers of the United States